Ezhuthapurangal is a 1987 Indian Malayalam film, directed by Sibi Malayil and produced by Mathew George. The film stars Suhasini, Ambika, Parvathy Jayaram and Murali in lead roles. The film had musical score by Johnson and Vidyadharan. Suhasini Mani Ratnam won the Kerala State Film Award For Best Actress for this film.

Plot
The story deals with three socially forward women, their friendship and the troubles they face in a male-dominated society. Rajalakshmi is a college lecturer and writer whose fiancée is not able to accept her ideals. Vimala is a divorced advocate bringing up a child on her own. Seetha is a college teacher, who is leading an unhappy married life with her husband.

Cast
Suhasini as Rajalakshmi (voice by aanadavally)
Ambika as Vimala Jacob (voice by bhagyalekshmi)
Parvathy Jayaram as Seetha (voice by sreeja)
Murali as Raveendranath 
Nedumudi Venu as Balakrishna Menon 
Babu Namboothiri as Binoy Chandy 
Sreenath as Sreenivasan 
Balachandran Chullikad as Balan 
K. P. A. C. Sunny as Advocate 
Kollam Thulasi as Judge 
Kothuku Nanappan as Gopalan Nair
Ranjith as Ramanandan

Soundtrack
The music was composed by Nedumudi Venu, Vidyadharan and Balachandran Chullikkad and the lyrics were written by O. N. V. Kurup, Balachandran Chullikkad and Nedumudi Venu.

References

External links
  
 

1987 films
1980s Malayalam-language films
Films shot in Palakkad
Films shot in Thiruvananthapuram
Films with screenplays by A. K. Lohithadas
Films directed by Sibi Malayil